Suzana Ansar with Khansar is debut band album of Suzana Ansar, alongside band members Syed Ansar, Imran Khan and Yamin Chowdhury. Released for Eid ul Adha in November 2009, 'Suzana Ansar with Khansar' by G Series. It was in the top ten charts and featured on NTV (Bangladesh) programme Music Jamz.

Background
Syed Ansar and Imran Khan met at Forest School in London. As teenagers, they started to record and write music together, inspired by The Beatles and Oasis, they had a release with the album Eclipse. Khansar is the mixture of both the surnames 'Ansar' and 'Khan'.

Syed's sister, Suzana, also studied at the same school, and joined with Khansar.

Yamin Chowdhury, nickname 'Shagor', is a trained tabla player. Learning Benares Gharana from guru Sanju Sahai, Yamin has accompanied artists from Bangladesh, India, Nepal, Pakistan as well as performing with fusion and world music. Coming from a famous musical dynasty, his relatives are Mahmudur Rahman Benu (Bangladesh freedom fighter '71 Mukti gaan fame), Khairul Anam Shakil, Nazim Chowdhury and Aly Zaker.

In early 2000, Chowdhury joined with Suzana Ansar, they performed as a duo, with harmonium and tabla for many years before joining forces with Syed and Imran to create the band Khansar and start working on the album in 2005/2006.

Composition
What started off as an experiment or hobby, as the songs shaped up an album release seemed more possible. They intend to mix Bangladesh and England. Recordings were made in a makeshift studio and vocal chamber in the bedroom and living room, 2005-2008 before shifting to a professional studio in London and Dhaka.

Choosing G Series, Bangladesh, to reach a wider Bengali audience. The album is a fusion with music of a western feel, using melodies from the writings poet Kazi Nazrul Islam, Bengali folk and Adhunik as well as self penned songs.

Track list

Personnel
All vocals are by Suzana Ansar, besides duet with Shafqat Ali Khan on "Amar Jamindar" and "Ruler Snapper" written and sung by Syed Ansar. Additional vocals by Imran Khan, rhythm/tabla by Yamin Chowdhury, mixed and mastered by Khansar/ZooEl, mastered by ZooEl, and produced by Khansar.

References

2009 albums
Bengali-language albums
Suzana Ansar albums